Walter Schmiele (12 April 1909 in Swinemünde – 21 October 1998 in Darmstadt) was a German writer and translator.

Life 
Schmiele grew up in Frankfurt am Main. He studied German literature, philosophy and history at the universities of Frankfurt,  Heidelberg, Vienna and Rostock.  He earned his Ph.D. in Frankfurt, with his dissertation on Theodor Storm. Among his teachers were Friedrich Gundolf, Karl Jaspers, Paul Tillich, Karl Mannheim, and Ernst Kantorowicz. Still a student, he began his freelance career for many newspapers. Between 1934 and 1941, he contributed more than 80 feature essays to the "Frankfurter Zeitung". He began living in Darmstadt in 1940. 

After the Second World War, he worked as a freelance journalist and literary critic for many newspapers and radio stations. He wrote poetry and short stories (published in the Reclam-Anthology "Deutsche Erzähler der Gegenwart", ("German Contemporary Storytellers") edited by  Willi Fehse, 1960)and in the Penguin "Twentieth-Century German Verse". Schmiele published essays and translated poetry and prose from the English language. His translation of Confessions of an English Opium-Eater ("Bekenntnisse eines englischen Opiumessers") von Thomas De Quincey, first published in 1947 (Parzeller) was re-issued by Goverts (1962), DTV (1965), Medusa (1982) and Insel (2009).

In the 1950s Walter Schmiele  initiated the radio program  "Vom Geist der Zeit"  (Spirit of Times) for the Hessischen Rundfunk and contributed many scripts to the program. In 1951-1953, he was  editor of the "Neue literarische Welt". From 1956 to 1962, he was Secretary-General of the German P.E.N.-Centre,  a position in which he organized the 1959 International  P.E.N. Congress held in Frankfurt. His 1961 published Monography on Henry Miller (rororo) was  regularly re-issued since then and was translated in various languages (among others in French, Japanese and Dutch). In 1990,  Schmiele edited a collection of texts by Kasimir Edschmid in the "Darmstädter Schriften" series ("Kasimir Edschmid, Essay – Rede – Feuilleton").

Personal works 
 1946: Unvergessliches Gesicht. Fünf Prosastücke
 1949: Englische Dichtung deutsch.
 1953: Englische Geisteswelt
 1954: Dichter über Dichtung
 1961: Stefan George
 1961: Henry Miller
 1963: Die Milch der Wölfin
 1963: Nietzsche: der gute Europäer
 1963: Über Ernst Jünger
 1963: Über Karl Jaspers
 1963: Dandy und Provokateur
 1963: Zwei Essays zur literarischen Lage
 1964: Versuch einer Sinnbestimmung des modernen Irrationalismus
 1966: Zur Geschichte der Utopie
 1984: Poesie der Welt, Nordamerika
 1985: Poesie der Welt, England
 1990: Kasimir Edschmid, Essay - Rede – Feuilleton
 2010: Mit wenigen Strichen. Porträts und Glossen

Translations 
 1948: John Keats, "Hyperion"
 1949: "Englische  Dichtung deutsch", von Blake bis Yeats;
 1947: De Quincey: "Bekenntnisse eines englischen Opiumessers"
 1960: Ferlinghetti, "Sie"

Awards 
 Lyrikpreis des Südverlags 1949
 Johann-Heinrich-Merck-Ehrung der Stadt Darmstadt 1970

See also
 Ernst Jünger
 Karl Jaspers
 Stefan George

References

External links 
 
 Publikationen

1909 births
1989 deaths
20th-century German translators
20th-century German male writers
People from Świnoujście
People from the Province of Pomerania
German male non-fiction writers